Red Wing (born Lilian Margaret St. Cyr; February 13, 1873 or 1884March 13, 1974) was an American actress of the silent era. She and her husband James Young Deer have been dubbed by some as one of the first Native American Hollywood "power couple(s)" along with Mona Darkfeather and her actor/director husband Frank E. Montgomery. St. Cyr was born on the Winnebago Reservation in Nebraska.

Early life
Lilian attended the Carlisle Indian Industrial School in Pennsylvania, which enrolled students from a variety of Native American tribes, between 1894 and 1902. She moved to Washington, D.C. to work as a domestic servant for Kansas Senator Chester I. Long and his wife. There she met and married James Younger Johnson, nicknamed James Young Deer, on April 9, 1906. Young Deer was of mixed European, African-American and Delaware Indian ancestry (according to St. Cyr) and a member of the Nanticoke tribe. A native of Washington, D.C., Young Deer served in the US Navy during the Spanish–American War.

Personal life and early roles
After they married the couple performed a Western act in various venues around New York City and Philadelphia. In 1908, St. Cyr appeared in the Kalem Company's The White Squaw, followed in May 1909 by Lubin's The Falling Arrow. In the summer of 1909 they worked as technical advisers and extras for The Mended Lute and Indian Runner's Romance both directed by D. W. Griffith. St. Cyr also appeared in the Vitagraph Studios' Red Wing's Gratitude that Fall as the character "Princess Red Wing". Concurrently, they worked for Bison films (New York Motion Picture Company), which relocated from New York City to Edendale in the fall of 1909.

Film
St. Cyr is best known for her feature role in The Squaw Man (1914) by producer/director Cecil B. DeMille and co-director Oscar Apfel, released in 1914. The movie starred Dustin Farnum and Monroe Salisbury. DeMille's first choice had actually been Mona Darkfeather, but she was under contract with the Kalem Company and had to turn down the offer. Her appearance in the film was actually preceded by Jesse Cornplanter's lead in the feature film Hiawatha, released in 1913, a year before The Squaw Man. After that last movie St. Cyr had a role with cowboy star Tom Mix in In the Days of the Thundering Herd (1914) and another one in Fighting Bob (1915). The 1916 version of Ramona, about Native Americans and Spanish colonists in early California, featured St. Cyr in a small role as Ramona's mother.

From 1908 to 1921, St. Cyr performed in more than 35 short Western films. She retired from acting in the 1920s and returned to New York City to settle. She was buried in the Roman Catholic St. Augustine Cemetery in Thurston County, Nebraska, near the Winnebago Reservation.

Popular culture
"Red Wing," a popular song of 1907 by Kerry Mills and Thurland Chattaway, was said to have been performed by her and was associated with her. However, film historians question this.

References

External links

 
 

19th-century births
1974 deaths
20th-century American actresses
Actresses from Nebraska
American silent film actresses
Native American actresses
People from Thurston County, Nebraska
Carlisle Indian Industrial School alumni
20th-century Native American women
20th-century Native Americans
Winnebago Tribe of Nebraska people